Flint Ridge Ancient Quarries and Nature Preserve is a Native American flint quarry located in Hopewell Township, Licking County, Ohio, about three miles north of Brownsville at the intersection of Brownsville Road and Flint Ridge Road.  Old quarry pits are visible, and a museum is located on the site.

Flint is a variety of quartz and the flint on the ridge is within the Vanport Limestone Member of the Allegheny Formation of Pennsylvanian age.

Flint Ridge  was an important source of flint and Native Americans extracted the flint from hundreds of quarries along the ridge. This "Ohio Flint" was traded across the eastern United States and has been found as far west as the Rocky Mountains and south around the Gulf of Mexico.

References

External links

 Flint Ridge State Memorial - official site
 FLINT - OHIO'S OFFICIAL GEMSTONE

Museums in Licking County, Ohio
National Register of Historic Places in Licking County, Ohio
Archaeological sites on the National Register of Historic Places in Ohio
State parks of Ohio
Ohio History Connection
Protected areas of Licking County, Ohio
Native American museums in Ohio
Mining museums in Ohio
Natural history museums in Ohio